Mary McCall may refer to:
 Mary C. McCall Jr., American screenwriter
 Mary Ann McCall, American pop and jazz singer